García II may refer to:

García Íñiguez of Pamplona (died 882), king of Pamplona
García Jiménez of Pamplona, (sub- or co-)king of a part of Pamplona in the late 9th century
García II Sánchez of Gascony called the Bent, was the duke of Gascony from sometime before 887 to his death
García Sánchez II of Pamplona (died 1000–1004), called the Trembling, the Tremulous, or the Trembler, king of Pamplona from 994 until his death
García Sánchez of Castile (died 1029) was the last independent count of Castile 
García II of Galicia and Portugal (c. 1042 – 1090), King of Galicia and Portugal
Garcia II of Kongo ruled the Kingdom of Kongo from 23 January 1641 to 1661